The 35th Lika Assault Division was a Yugoslav Partisan division formed on 30 January 1944. It was formed from the 1st and 2nd Lika Brigades of Operational Staff for Lika. Lika Partisan Detachment, Plavi Jadran Battalion and an Artillery divizion were also part of the division upon formation, at the time it had 2,262 fighters. It was part of thee 11th Corps and it operated in territory controlled by Independent State of Croatia.

References 

Divisions of the Yugoslav Partisans
Military units and formations established in 1944